Parshino is a rural locality (a village) in Pertsevskoye Rural Settlement, Gryazovetsky District, Vologda Oblast, Russia. The population was 63 as of 2002.

Geography 
Parshino is located 24 km northeast of Gryazovets (the district's administrative centre) by road. Klimovo is the nearest rural locality.

References 

Rural localities in Gryazovetsky District